Sokolovo is a village in Dryanovo Municipality, in Gabrovo Province, in northern central Bulgaria.

References

Villages in Gabrovo Province